The 2023 Antalya Challenger was a professional tennis tournament played on clay courts. It was the fifth edition of the tournament which was part of the 2023 ATP Challenger Tour. It took place in Antalya, Turkey between 6 and 12 March 2023.

Singles main-draw entrants

Seeds

1 Rankings as of 27 February 2023.

Other entrants
The following players received wildcards into the singles main draw:
  Yankı Erel
  Vilius Gaubas
  Ergi Kırkın

The following players received entry from the qualifying draw:
  Mirza Bašić
  Salvatore Caruso
  Mathys Erhard
  Gianmarco Ferrari
  Gerald Melzer
  Stefano Travaglia

The following player received entry as a lucky loser:
  Lukas Neumayer

Champions

Singles

 Fábián Marozsán def.  Sebastian Ofner 7–5, 6–0.

Doubles

 Filip Bergevi /  Petros Tsitsipas def.  Sarp Ağabigün /  Ergi Kırkın 6–2, 6–4.

References

2023 ATP Challenger Tour
March 2023 sports events in Turkey
2023 in Turkish sport